Guillermo "Guille" Luis Franco Farquarson (born 3 November 1976) is a former professional footballer who played as a striker. Born in Argentina, he represented the Mexico national team.

Early life
Guillermo Franco was born in Corrientes, the capital city of the Corrientes Province in Argentina.

Club career

San Lorenzo
Franco began his career with Argentine Primera División side San Lorenzo, playing with the team from 1996 to 2002 mainly as a right winger.

Monterrey
He then joined Mexican Monterrey in the middle of 2002, and made his debut during the 2002 Apertura. Franco was very successful with the Rayados, and led the league in scoring during the 2004 Apertura with 15 goals in 16 games, playing as a striker. He was part of the team that won the Mexican Primera División championship in 2003 and achieved runner-up position twice in 2004 and 2005.

Villareal
Subsequently, Franco spent three years in Spain playing for Villarreal, but his spell was plagued with injuries. In his first season, Franco helped Villareal reach the semifinal of the UEFA Champions League where they lost to Arsenal. Franco also scored a goal that qualified Villarreal for the UEFA Cup, in a 1–0 victory against Celta de Vigo.

West Ham United
In September 2009, Franco signed for West Ham United on a one-year contract, becoming the first Mexican to play for the Hammers. On 25 September, it was disclosed that due to West Ham's perilous financial situation following former chairman Björgólfur Guðmundsson's financial collapse, West Ham's CEO Scott Duxbury, and their Sporting and Football Technical Director Gianluca Nani, had part financed the deal from their own salaries.
Franco made his debut for West Ham on 17 October 2009 in a 2–1 away defeat to Stoke City.
He scored his first goal for the team on 31 October 2009 to put them 1–0 up against Sunderland away from home, in a game that finished 2–2. Franco became the third Mexican player to score in the Premier League, Jared Borgetti and Carlos Vela being the first and second respectively. On 24 April 2010, Franco assisted Scott Parker, who scored for the winner in a 3–2 victory against Wigan Athletic; a win which would see them safe from relegation. In May it was announced that West Ham would release Franco.

Vélez Sársfield
The striker then spent one semester as a free agent, until he joined Vélez Sársfield back in Argentina in January 2011. He signed a one-year deal, and made his debut coming on as a second-half substitute for Santiago Silva in a 2–2 draw at Independiente in the first fixture of the 2011 Clausura. Subsequently, he played the starting minutes of the Copa Libertadores debut against Caracas FC, suffering a shoulder injury that left him out for the remainder of the season. Having played less than 30 minutes, he offered the club to terminate his contract, or suspend his salary until he recovered, though Vélez rejected it. He returned for the 2011 Copa Libertadores quarter-finals, entering the field and scoring one goal from a penalty in a 4–2 victory over Libertad. He also played the last 5 games of the 2011 Clausura (one as a starter), helping his team win the Argentine league title.

Pachuca
On 21 January 2012, he joined Pachuca of the Mexican Primera División. The next season, the Chicago Fire signed him.

Chicago Fire
Franco signed with Major League Soccer club Chicago Fire on 14 September 2012.  On 21 January 2013 the club announced Franco's contract option was not picked up for the new season.

On 29 January 2013, Franco announced his retirement from football.

International career
In 2004, Franco became a naturalized Mexican citizen after settling in Mexico in 2002; and made senior national team debut in 2005.

Franco played at the 2006 FIFA World Cup and was a part of the 2009 CONCACAF Gold Cup squad. During the 2010 World Cup qualification, he contributed two goals in six games. He played in all four matches for Mexico at the 2010 FIFA World Cup.

In September 2010, Franco announced his retirement from international football.

Career statistics

Club

International

International goals
Scores and results list Mexico's goal tally first, score column indicates score after each Franco goal.

Honours
San Lorenzo
Argentine Primera División: 2001 Clausura
Copa Mercosur: 2001

Monterrey
Mexican Primera División: 2003 Clausura

Vélez Sársfield
Argentine Primera División: 2011 Clausura

Mexico
CONCACAF Gold Cup: 2009

Individual
Mexican Primera División Golden Ball: Clausura 2003
Mexican Primera División Top scorer: 2004 Apertura

References

External links
 
 FootballDatabase.com Profile
 
 
 
 Argentine Primera statistics at Fútbol XXI 

1976 births
Living people
People from Corrientes
Mexican footballers
Mexico international footballers
Argentine footballers
Naturalized citizens of Mexico
Argentine emigrants to Mexico
Association football forwards
Mexican expatriate footballers
Argentine expatriate footballers
Mexican expatriate sportspeople in England
Argentine Primera División players
San Lorenzo de Almagro footballers
Club Atlético Vélez Sarsfield footballers
Chicago Fire FC players
Liga MX players
C.F. Monterrey players
C.F. Pachuca players
La Liga players
Villarreal CF players
Premier League players
Major League Soccer players
West Ham United F.C. players
Expatriate footballers in Spain
Expatriate footballers in England
Expatriate soccer players in the United States
2006 FIFA World Cup players
2009 CONCACAF Gold Cup players
2010 FIFA World Cup players
CONCACAF Gold Cup-winning players
Mexican Christians
Sportspeople from Corrientes Province